Panchavati is an ancient holy city in Nasik, Maharashtra.

Panchavati may also refer to:

Ecology

 Panchavati trees, are trees sacred to Indian-origin religions, such as Hinduism, Buddhism and Jainism, such trees are the Vata (Ficus benghalensis, Banyan), Ashvattha (Ficus religiosa, Peepal), Bilva (Aegle marmelos, Bengal Quince), Amalaki (Phyllanthus emblica, Indian Gooseberry, Amla), Ashoka (Saraca asoca, Ashok), Udumbara (Ficus racemosa, Cluster Fig, Gular), Nimba (Azadirachta indica, Neem)and Shami (Prosopis spicigera, Indian Mesquite).

Places 

 Panchavati High School, Secunderabad, Telangana, India
 The Prime Minister's residential complex at 7, Lok Kalyan Marg, New Delhi, India
 Panchavati, Kolkata, where Indian sage Ramakrishna performed his 1865 advaitic sadhana
 A sacred grove with five trees — banyan, bael, amalaki, ashoka and peepul; see Sacred groves of India
 The forest home of Hindu deity Rama in the ancient Indian epic Ramayana

Literature 
 "Panchavati", a poem by National Poet of India Shri Maithili Sharan Gupt